{{Infobox Court Case
| name = Turberville v Stampe 
| court = 
| image = 
| date decided = 
| full name = 
| citations = (1697) 91 ER 1072
| judges = 
| prior actions =  
| subsequent actions = 
| opinions = Chief Justice Holt
| transcripts =
| keywords = Vicarious liability
}}Turberville v Stampe' (1697) 91 ER 1072 is an English tort law case concerning vicarious liability, also known as the respondeat superior doctrine.

Facts
The employee or "servant" of the defendant negligently began a fire which spread to and damaged a neighbour's house. The master argued he was not responsible because he was not personally at fault. Moreover, he had directed the employee the proper method of lighting fires, orders which were not followed.

Judgment
Lord Chief Justice Holt gave judgment.

Significance
Holt carried this broad vicarious liability into the commercial setting, noting that ‘the master at his peril ought to take care what servant he employs; and it is more reasonable, that [the master] should suffer for the cheats of his servant than strangers’ (ibid., 91 ER 797)

See also
More from HoltJones v Hart 2 Salk 441Middleton v Fowler 1 Salk 282 Hern v Nichols 1 Salk 289

On liability for strangers and acts of God emanating from landSedleigh Denfield v O'Callaghan [1940] AC 880Goldman v Hargrave [1967] 1 AC 645Smith v Littlewoods Organisation Ltd [1987] 1 AC 241Leakey v National Trust [1980] QB 485

On vicarious liabilityLister v Hesley Hall Ltd [2002] 1 AC 215Hall (Inspector of Taxes) v Lorimer [1994] 1 All ER 250, freelance vision mixer not an employee for tax purposes, ‘never been better put than by Cooke J’ in Market Investigations Ltd v Minister of Social Security [1969] 2 QB 173Lee Ting Sang v Chung Chi-Keung'' [1990] 2 AC 374, 384, had own tools, paid by piece and did not price the job. ‘The applicant ran no risk whatever save that of being unable to find employment which is, of course, a risk faced by casual employees who move from one job to another…’

Articles
O Kahn-Freund, ‘Servants and Independent-Contractors’ (1951) 14 Modern Law Review 504, control test unrealistic today
JW Neyers, ‘A Theory of Vicarious Liability’ (2005) 43 Alberta Law Review 287

English tort case law
Lord Holt cases
1697 in law
1697 in England
Court of King's Bench (England) cases